Donald Rubin Burgess (born August 6th, 1946) is a Canadian retired professional ice hockey winger who played 446 games in the World Hockey Association. He played with the Philadelphia Blazers, Vancouver Blazers, San Diego Mariners, and Indianapolis Racers.

References

External links

1946 births
Living people
Canadian ice hockey left wingers
Greensboro Generals (EHL) players
Ice hockey people from Ontario
Indianapolis Racers players
Philadelphia Blazers players
San Diego Mariners players
Vancouver Blazers players